Isaiah 39 is the thirty-ninth chapter of the Book of Isaiah in the Hebrew Bible or the Old Testament of the Christian Bible. This book contains the prophecies attributed to the prophet Isaiah, and is one of the Books of the Prophets. This chapter concludes the section of Isaiah attributed to Isaiah himself (Proto-Isaiah). In the New King James Version, this chapter is sub-titled "The Babylonian Envoys". Isaiah foretells the exile to Babylon of the people of Judah.

Text 
The original text was written in Hebrew language. This chapter is divided into 8 verses.

Textual witnesses
Some early manuscripts containing the text of this chapter in Hebrew are of the Masoretic Text tradition, which includes the Codex Cairensis (895), the Petersburg Codex of the Prophets (916), Aleppo Codex (10th century), Codex Leningradensis (1008).

Fragments containing parts of this chapter were found among the Dead Sea Scrolls (3rd century BC or later):
 1QIsaa: complete
 1QIsab: complete
 4QIsab (4Q56): complete

There is also a translation into Koine Greek known as the Septuagint, made in the last few centuries BCE. Extant ancient manuscripts of the Septuagint version include Codex Vaticanus (B; B; 4th century), Codex Sinaiticus (S; BHK: S; 4th century), Codex Alexandrinus (A; A; 5th century) and Codex Marchalianus (Q; Q; 6th century).

Parashot
The parashah sections listed here are based on the Aleppo Codex. Isaiah 39 is a part of the Narrative (Isaiah 36–39). {P}: open parashah; {S}: closed parashah.
 {S} 39:1-2 {S} 39:3-8 {P}

Verse 1
At that time Merodachbaladan, the son of Baladan, king of Babylon, sent letters and a present to Hezekiah: for he had heard that he had been sick, and was recovered.

See also
 Babylon
 Babylonian Chronicles
 Hezekiah
 Isaiah, son of Amoz
 Jerusalem
 Kingdom of Judah
 Merodach-baladan
 Related Bible parts: 2 Kings 19, 2 Kings 20, 2 Chronicles 32

References

Bibliography

External links

Jewish
 Isaiah 39 Hebrew with Parallel English

Christian
 Isaiah 39 English Translation with Parallel Latin Vulgate

39
Babylonia
Hezekiah